Blackmore River flows into Darwin Harbour close to Darwin in the  Northern Territory of Australia.

Course 
The river  discharges into Darwin Harbour.

The estuary formed at the river mouth is tidal in nature and in near pristine condition.

Climate 

The climate of the Blackmore River region is monsoon tropical with two distinct seasons: the Dry and the Wet. The Dry lasts for 6 months between April and September with an average rainfall of 24 mm, whereas the Wet lasts between October and March with an average monthly rainfall of 254 mm/month (according to the Bureau of Meteorology, 1999). The majority of the rain falls between December and April. Runoff varies between 250–1000 mm.

Peak flow for the Blackmore River occurs in February with 605Ml/day, after which it slowly decreases until July when there is no freshwater input into Darwin Harbour until the onset of the following wet season (Padovan 1997). Cyclone frequency is low to moderate.

Water quality 

The water quality at the upper estuary and freshwater monitoring sites of the Department of Land Resource Management of the Northern Territory Government was 2011 in moderate condition.

Geology  

The underlying lithology is dominated by Permian siltstones and sandstones.

See also

List of rivers of Northern Territory

References

Rivers of the Northern Territory